Rytwiany  is a village in Staszów County, Świętokrzyskie Voivodeship, in south-central Poland. It is the seat of the gmina (administrative district) called Gmina Rytwiany. The village has a population of  1,827.

Rytwiany, which belongs to the historic province of Lesser Poland, has a rich and long history. First documented owner of the village was a nobleman named Piotr Bogoria Skotnicki (13th century), and across the centuries, Rytwiany belonged to a number of owners, including Cardinal Wojciech Jastrzębiec, Hieronymus Jaroslaw Łaski, the Lubomirski family, the Potocki family, the Radziwiłł family, and several others. 
 
In 1425 - 1436, Bishop Jastrzębiec built a defensive Gothic castle in Rytwiany, surrounded by the swamps of the Czarna river. The castle, partly destroyed in 1657 (see Deluge) was inhabited until the 19th century, then fell into a ruin, to be finally demolished in 1859. All that now remains of it is a fortified tower. In the early 17th century, when the village and the castle belonged to the Tęczyński family, it was a cultural center of the region. In 1621, upon request of Jan Tęczyński, Camaldolese monks settled here, building an abbey and a church. The monks moved to Warsaw in 1819, and their church now serves as a local parish church. In the late 19th century, the Radziwiłł family, who were the last owners of the village, built here a palace, which was remodelled in 2005 and now is a hotel.

Demography 
According to the 2002 Poland census, there were 1,672 people residing in Rytwiany village, of whom 49.5% were male and 50.5% were female. In the village, the population was spread out, with 23.7% under the age of 18, 37.7% from 18 to 44, 21.2% from 45 to 64, and 17.3% who were 65 years of age or older.
 Figure 1. Population pyramid of village in 2002 — by age group and sex

References

Villages in Staszów County
Radom Governorate
Kielce Voivodeship (1919–1939)